The 2023 Pacific F2000 Championship is the twentieth season of the Formula 2000-level single-seater championship across the Western US.

The season is held over six weekends from February to November 2023.

Drivers 
All drivers compete using F2000 cars as specified by the series regulations, powered by a 2L Ford Zetec engine on Hoosier Tires.

Calendar and results 
The calendar, announced in November 2022, spans six race weekends and features four circuits.

Race results

Championship standings

Scoring system 
Two points are awarded for pole position and fastest lap. All started drivers that fail to finish inside the top 19 after completing 50% of the race are awarded one point.

Drivers' Championship

References

External links 

 

Pacific F2000
Pacific F2000
Pacific F2000